16–18 South Methven Street is an historic building in Perth, Scotland. Dating to 1894, the building is Category B listed.

Designed by Peter Roy Jackson, who was articled to Perth architect Andrew Heiton, it is a three-storey property with attic, including a four-bay corner tenement. It has an octagonal corner dormer surmounted by an ogee-roofed copper drum. Historic Environment Scotland describes the structure as "a prominent and well-detailed red sandstone building".

As of 2022, the ground floor is occupied by a PizzaExpress.

See also
List of listed buildings in Perth, Scotland

References

1894 establishments in Scotland
Methven Street South 16-18
Category B listed buildings in Perth and Kinross